Keith Edward Meyer (June 20, 1938 – July 27, 2010) was an American speed skater. He competed in the men's 1500 metres event at the 1960 Winter Olympics.

References

1938 births
2010 deaths
American male speed skaters
Olympic speed skaters of the United States
Speed skaters at the 1960 Winter Olympics
People from Geneva, Illinois